Omar Khairat (born November 11, 1948) is an Egyptian musician.

Early life
Born in Cairo, Omar was raised in a family of musicians. His uncle, Abu Bakr Khairat, a composer and architect, established the Cairo Conservatoire.

Career
Omar was a drummer for the Egyptian rock band Les Petits Chats until 1971.

Works
In January 2019, Omar Khairat performed a live concert in Al-'Ula, Saudi Arabia.

See also
List of Egyptian composers
Music of Egypt

References

External links
Omar Khairat's web page

Egyptian composers
Musicians from Cairo
Egyptian pianists
Egyptian classical pianists
1948 births
Living people
Egyptian film score composers
21st-century classical pianists